West Down was a constituency of the Parliament of Northern Ireland.

Boundaries
West Down was a county constituency comprising part of western County Down. It was created when the House of Commons (Method of Voting and Redistribution of Seats) Act (Northern Ireland) 1929 introduced first-past-the-post elections throughout Northern Ireland. West Down was created by the division of Down into eight new constituencies. It survived unchanged, returning one Member of Parliament, until the Parliament of Northern Ireland was temporarily suspended in 1972, and then formally abolished in 1973.

The seat included the town of Banbridge, and also certain district electoral divisions of the rural districts of Banbridge and Newry No.1.

Politics 
The seat had a substantial unionist majority and was always won by Ulster Unionist Party candidates. It was contested on three occasions by independent unionists, each of whom won over 40% of the votes cast, and once by a communist candidate.

Members of Parliament

Election results 

At the 1929 Northern Ireland general election, Robert McBride was elected unopposed.

At the 1949, 1953 and 1958 Northern Ireland general elections, John Edgar Bailey was elected unopposed.

At the 1959 by-election and the 1962 Northern Ireland general election, David John Little was elected unopposed.

At the 1965 by-election and the 1965 Northern Ireland general election, John Dobson was elected unopposed.

References

Historic constituencies in County Down
Northern Ireland Parliament constituencies established in 1929
Constituencies of the Northern Ireland Parliament
Northern Ireland Parliament constituencies disestablished in 1973